Giovanni Camillo Maffei da Solofra was an Italian doctor, philosopher and musician of the mid-16th century, in the middle Renaissance.

Between 1562 and 1573 he lived in Naples, where he served Giovanni di Capua, count of Altavilla and music lover. In his philosophy he was Aristotelian. He wrote a treatise on vocal music, "Lettera sul canto", in which he sets forth rules for the singing of diminutions. The letter is included in the two volumes of his Lettere (Napoli, 1562) also cited as Discorso delta voce e del modo d'apparare di cantar di garganta, and Scala naturale, overo Fantasia dolcissima, intorno alle cose occulte e desiderate nella filosofia (Venice, 1564), dedicated to the Count of Altavilla, where it runs on various points of natural history, physics, meteorology, geology and chemistry.

Italian music theorists